Hanging In is an American sitcom television series that aired for four episodes on CBS on Wednesday nights from August 8, 1979, to August 29, 1979.

Summary
After his failed attempt to launch the sitcom Mr. Dugan, Norman Lear reworked the project, finally coming up with Hanging In, the story of Lou Harper, a former professional football star who becomes president of fictional Braddock University. Bill Macy (who had played Maude's husband, Walter Findlay, in Maude) resurfaced as the star of the version that finally did air, in August 1979.

Most of the supporting cast of Mr. Dugan and its several different incarnations (including the final three episodes of Maude and the unsold pilot Onward and Upward, which featured Good Times star John Amos) also appeared in Hanging In. As The Complete Directory to Prime Time Network and Cable TV Shows: 1946-Present by Tim Brooks and Earle Marsh dryly put it, "the actors must have known their lines pretty well by this point", as the scripts on each project were nearly identical.

In the end, Hanging In lasted just four weeks on CBS, leaving the air after its August 29, 1979 broadcast.

Cast
Bill Macy as Louis "Lou" Harper
Barbara Rhoades as Maggie Gallagher
Dennis Burkley as Sam Dickey
Nedra Volz as Pinky Nolan
Darian Mathias as Rita Zefferelli

Episodes

References

External links
 

1979 American television series debuts
1979 American television series endings
1970s American sitcoms
CBS original programming
1970s American college television series
English-language television shows
Television series by Sony Pictures Television
Television shows filmed in Toronto
Television series created by Norman Lear
Television shows set in Connecticut